Tartu Karlova Gymnaasium (Estonian: Tartu Karlova Gümnaasium; abbreviated as TKG) is a secondary school in Tartu, Estonia. The school was founded in 1875 by Pauline Jürgens.

History 
Tartu Karlova Gymnasium is one of the oldest schools in Tartu. Its roots go back as far as 1875 when Pauline Jürgens II founded her own private school. The name and the address have changed during that time. Today's building at Lina 2 street was finished in 1925 and was known as the "Tartu City 7th Primary School".
In 1967 the new part of the school was built and with new specialised music and history classes. Since then the school has been a highschool. On 1 September 1995, the name of the school was changed to the "Tartu Karlova Gymnasium".

References

External links

Schools in Tartu
1875 establishments in the Russian Empire
Educational institutions established in 1875